is a Japanese manga series by Tamekou. My Androgynous Boyfriend has been serialized in the monthly  manga magazine Feel Young since February 8, 2018. A live-action television drama adaptation titled  began airing on April 1, 2021, as part of NTV's MokuDra F programming block.

Plot

Wako works as a manga editor at a publishing department, while her boyfriend, Meguru, is a model and a clerk at a clothing store with a large social media following. Meguru is part of the genderless fashion subculture and is knowledgeable about make-up and fashion, causing other people around the couple to tend to mistake the nature of their relationship, as well as Meguru's gender.

Characters

Portrayed by: Ai Yoshikawa
Wako works as a manga editor at a publishing company. She does not pay attention to her looks often.

Portrayed by: 
Meguru is an androgynous model and a clothing store clerk with a large social media following. He partakes in the genderless fashion subculture and is knowledgeable about fashion and make-up.

Portraed by: 
Sasame is an androgynous with a cute, dreamy appearance. He is in an idol group with Meguru as the Unicorn Boys; however, he dislikes cute clothing and wants to be seen as manly, using his idol Aki from Exilia as an example.

Portrayed by: Renn Kiriyama
Kira is an androgynous model with a "cool" and "beautiful" appearance.

Portrayed by: Miki Mizuno
An original character for the television drama adaptation, Asahi is Wako's co-worker and works in the same manga editing department, in addition to being Kira's love interest.

Portrayed by: 
An original character for the television drama adaptation, Masami is Wako's co-worker who works in the same department as a manga editor.

Media

Manga

My Androgynous Boyfriend is written and illustrated by Tamekou as her first work outside of the  genre. It is serialized in the monthly manga magazine Feel Young, beginning in the March 2018 issue released on February 8, 2018. The series will end serialization in the April 2023 issue released on March 8, 2023. The chapters have been released in three bound volumes by Shodensha under the Feel Comics FC Swing imprint.

To celebrate the release of the second volume, an art exhibit was featured at the Animate Girls Festival 2019. Tamekou herself hosted a panel with genderless actor and model Toman as a guest.

At Anime Expo 2019, Seven Seas Entertainment announced that they had licensed the series in English for North American distribution.

Television drama

A live-action television series adaptation titled Colorful Love: Genderless Danshi ni Aisareteimasu was announced on March 2, 2021. The series began airing on April 1, 2021, on NTV and YTV as part of their MokuDra F programming block, with 10 episodes scheduled. Additional cast members include Renn Kiriyama as Kira and Miki Mizuno as Asahi Tetsumoto.  was later announced as a regular cast member, appearing as Masami Sakai. Hirotsugu Otsu and Kōsei Awaji, who are members of the group Kougu Ishin and the comedy duo Kitsune, made a guest appearance in episode 1 as part of a collaboration. The series is directed by Izuru Kumasaka, Hiroaki Yuasa, and Takeshi Matsuura, with Fumi Tsubota in charge of the script and Akihiro Manabe in charge of the soundtrack. The show's theme song is "Question" by Amber's.

Episode list

Reception

Rebecca Silverman from Anime News Network praised My Androgynous Boyfriend for its artwork and "sweet romance" but mentioned that while the series brings up issues about gender, it ultimately doesn't do "enough" with them.

Notes

References

External links 
  
  of the TV drama 
 

2018 manga
2021 Japanese television series debuts
Androgyny in fiction
Fiction about social media
Japanese television dramas based on manga
Josei manga
Romantic comedy anime and manga
Seven Seas Entertainment titles
Shodensha manga
Slice of life anime and manga
Television series about social media